Steven Duffy (born 16 April 1980 in West Kilbride, Scotland) is a former Scotland Club XV international rugby union footballer who played at Centre. He played for Glasgow Warriors.

Amateur career
Duffy started out with Ardrossan Academicals.

He played for Glasgow District U18s at provincial level.

He then moved on to Glasgow Hawks. He captained the Hawks in 2006-07 and in 2008-09.

Professional career
Duffy joined Glasgow Warriors as one of their academy players in season 2004-05.

He played for Glasgow Warriors against Edinburgh Rugby in a pre-season match in 2005-06 season. Glasgow lost the match 7 - 24.

He played for Glasgow Warriors again in their pre-season match against Newcastle Falcons Academy in that same season. He scored a try in the match with the Warriors running out 50 - 5 winners.

International career
Duffy was selected for the Scotland 7s.

He was also selected for Scotland Club XV and was capped in 2006.

References

External links
Hawick v Hawks - The Telegraph
Hawks v Heriots - The Scotsman
Glasgow Hawks' Steven Duffy with the Scottish Cup - Flickr

1980 births
Living people
Glasgow Warriors players
Ardrossan Academicals players
Glasgow Hawks players
Scotland international rugby sevens players
Male rugby sevens players
Scotland Club XV international rugby union players